Machadoia diminuta is a moth in the subfamily Arctiinae. It was described by Francis Walker in 1855. It is found in Brazil.

References

Moths described in 1855